"Gut Bucket" is a funk song performed by James Brown. It was recorded in 2005 with a group of musicians that included Fred Wesley and Pee Wee Ellis along with members of Brown's current touring band. Intended for a studio album that remains unreleased, it appeared instead on a CD compilation, James Brown's Funky Summer, included with the August 2006 issue of MOJO. It is the last original James Brown recording to be released to date.

References

James Brown songs
Songs written by James Brown
2006 songs